Walter Stanley Keane (October 7, 1915 – December 27, 2000) was an American plagiarist who became famous in the 1960s as the claimed painter of a series of widely reproduced paintings depicting vulnerable subjects with enormous eyes. The paintings are now accepted as having been painted by his wife, Margaret Keane. When she told her side of the story, Walter Keane retaliated with a USA Today article that again claimed he had done the work.

In 1986, Margaret Keane sued Walter and USA Today. In the subsequent slander suit, the judge demanded that the litigants paint a painting in the courtroom, but Walter declined, citing a sore shoulder. Margaret then produced a painting for the jurors in 53 minutes. The jury awarded her damages of $4 million.

Biography
Keane was born in Lincoln, Nebraska, on October 7, 1915, one of 10 children from his father's second marriage. His mother, Alma Christina (Johnson) Keane, was from Denmark, and his father, William Robert Keane, was of Irish descent. Keane grew up near the center of Lincoln and made money by selling shoes. In the early 1930s, he moved to Los Angeles, California, where he attended Los Angeles City College. He moved to Berkeley, California, in the 1940s with his wife, Barbara (née Ingham), and went into real estate; both were real estate brokers.

Their first child, a son, died shortly after birth in the hospital. In 1947, they had a healthy baby girl, Susan Hale Keane.

In July 1948, Walter and Barbara bought the stately John J. Cairns House at 2729 Elmwood Avenue, designed by Berkeley architect Walter H. Ratcliff Jr. In 1948, the Keanes traveled to Europe, living in Heidelberg and later Paris. When they returned to their home in Berkeley, they began an educational toy business, "Susie Keane's Puppeteens", teaching children French through the use of handmade puppets, phonograph records and a book. The "ballroom" of their large home became an assembly line of hand-painted wooden puppets, with various intricately made costumes. The puppets were sold in high-end stores such as Saks Fifth Avenue.

Barbara Keane later became head of her own department in dress design at the University of California, Berkeley. Walter Keane subsequently closed both his real estate firm and the toy company in order to work full-time on his painting. Their marriage ended in divorce in 1952.

At a fairground in 1953, Walter met an artist making charcoal sketches, Margaret (Doris Hawkins) Ulbrich. They married in 1955 and separated on November 1, 1964. During their marriage, and for a time afterward, Walter sold his wife's highly stylized "big eyes" paintings as his own (taking credit for her work). In doing so, he made millions of dollars over the years. The film Big Eyes depicts the story in detail.

Walter married his third wife, Joan Mervin, after divorcing Margaret in 1965. They had two children in the early 1970s, while living in London. This marriage also ended in divorce.

Keane was 85 when he died on December 27, 2000, in Encinitas, California.

Art
Keane first displayed Margaret's paintings as his own work in 1957, at an outdoor art show in Washington Square in Manhattan. The paintings swiftly gained a following. In 1961, The Prescolite Manufacturing Corporation bought "Our Children" and presented it to the United Nations Children's Fund; it is in the United Nations permanent collection of art. In 1965, Keane was named "one of the most controversial and most successful painters at work today". Artworks credited to him were owned by many celebrities and hanging in a number of permanent collections.

LIFE magazine interviewed Keane in 1965. He claimed his inspiration for the big-eyed children came when he was in Europe as an art student: "My psyche was scarred in my art student days in Europe, just after World War II, by an ineradicable memory of war-wracked innocents. In their eyes lurk all of mankind's questions and answers. If mankind would look deep into the soul of the very young, he wouldn't need a road map. I wanted other people to know about those eyes, too. I want my paintings to clobber you in the heart and make you yell, 'DO SOMETHING!'". In the same interview, he said, "Nobody could paint eyes like El Greco, and nobody can paint eyes like Walter Keane".

In 1970, Margaret Keane announced on a radio broadcast that she was the real creator of the paintings. The Keanes continued to dispute the paintings' origin, and after Walter suggested that Margaret claimed she was the painter only because she believed he was dead, she sued him in federal court for slander. At the hearing, the judge ordered both Margaret and Walter to create a big-eyed child painting in the courtroom. Walter declined to paint before the court, citing a sore shoulder, whereas Margaret completed her painting in 53 minutes. After three weeks of trial, a jury awarded Margaret $4 million in damages. A federal appeals court upheld the verdict of defamation in 1990 but overturned the $4 million damage award.

Film depiction

Tim Burton directed and produced the 2014 film Big Eyes based on Margaret Keane's life. It was released in theaters in December 2014, with Christoph Waltz playing Walter Keane and Amy Adams playing Margaret. Adams won a Golden Globe Award for her performance.

References

Further reading

 

American fraudsters
1915 births
2000 deaths
People from Lincoln, Nebraska
Los Angeles City College alumni
American real estate businesspeople
20th-century American businesspeople
American people of Danish descent
American people of Irish descent